The Jet Award, named in honor of 1972 Heisman Trophy Winner Johnny "The Jet" Rodgers, is awarded to the top return specialist in college football beginning with the 2011 season. Joe Adams was announced as the first winner on March 29, 2012. Beginning with the 2012 award ceremony, in addition to being given to the annual award winner, the Rodgers Award will be presented retroactively one decade at a time, starting with the 1959–1969 winners.

Winners

Legacy winners

References

College football national player awards
Awards established in 2011